Lenino in Kazakhstan may refer to:
Karatobe, Almaty Region
Lenino, Pavlodar Region